Harsh Vardhan  (born Harshvardhan Goel, 13 December 1954) is an Indian otorhinolaryngologist. He had served as the Minister of Health and Family Welfare, Minister of Science and Technology and Minister of Earth Sciences in the BJP-led NDA government of Prime Minister Narendra Modi from 30 May 2019 to 7 July 2021. He represents Chandni Chowk in Delhi as a Member of Parliament in the 17th Lok Sabha. He was elected to the office of Chairperson of Executive Board of the World Health Organization from May 22, 2020. Vardhan has been prominent in the Indian government's response to the COVID-19 pandemic. He later resigned from his cabinet post ahead of the cabinet reshuffle in July 2021.

As MP Chandni Chowk
He was elected as MP of  Chandni Chowk in 2014 Lok Sabha elections.  He was again elected as MP in 2019 Lok Sabha elections.

Early life
Harsh Vardhan was born in Delhi to Om Prakash Goel and Sneh Lata Goel. Vardhan finished his schooling from Happy School, Daryaganj, in 1971. He attended Zakir Husain Delhi College of the University of Delhi and Ganesh Shankar Vidyarthi Memorial Medical College of the Kanpur University, where he graduated in 1979 with a Bachelor of Medicine, Bachelor of Surgery. He earned his Master of Surgery in Otorhinolaryngology from the same college in 1983. He has been a member of the Rashtriya Swayamsevak Sangh since childhood.

Political career
In 1993, Vardhan was elected as a member of the Delhi Assembly representing Krishna Nagar. He was appointed as the State Minister of Health and Minister of Law for Delhi. He later became the state Minister of Education in 1996. He has been re-elected from the same constituency in the 1998, 2003, 2008 and 2013 elections.

Minister of Health and Family Affairs of Delhi
Vardhan as the State Minister of Health in 1994 oversaw the implementation of the pilot project of the Pulse Polio Programme which involved the mass immunisation of 1 million children up to the age of 3 in Delhi.  In 1995, this programme was launched nationwide leading to 88 million children being immunised. On 28 March 2014, India was declared polio-free by the WHO, as there had been no reported cases for three years.

In 1997, the Delhi Prohibition of Smoking and Non-Smokers Health Protection Act was passed in the Delhi assembly which was one of the first anti-tobacco laws implemented by any state government. The act applied across the NCT of Delhi. It prohibited smoking in places of public work or use for example hospitals, restaurants, and educational institutions and in public service vehicles. It also prohibited the sale of smoking substances such as tobacco and beedis to anyone below the age of eighteen. Smoking products could not also be sold or stored within 100 metres of any educational institution. Under the provisions of the act, fines would be applied to anyone who contravened the law and they could potentially be ejected from places of public use by the police.

2013 Delhi Assembly elections
On 23 October 2013, Vardhan was named the Chief Minister candidate for Delhi Assembly elections by the BJP. After the 2013 elections, BJP emerged as the single largest party winning 31 out of the 70 seats in the Fifth Legislative Assembly of Delhi. However, they fell short of an absolute majority so were unable to form the government.

2014 Lok Sabha election
Vardhan contested the Chandni Chowk seat in Delhi where he defeated the incumbent Union Minister of Law and Justice, Kapil Sibal of the Indian National Congress. He was also appointed in the first Narendra Modi government as Minister of Health and Family Welfare on 26 May 2014. In May 2017, he was given the additional charge of Ministry of Environment, Forest and Climate Change following the death of Minister Anil Madhav Dave.

2019 Lok Sabha election
Vardhan again contested the Chandni Chowk seat in Delhi where he defeated Congress candidate Jai Parkash Aggarwal by a margin of 2,28,145 votes. While he received 52.94% votes, runner-up Aggarwal polled 29.67% votes.

As Union Minister

On 30 May 2019, Vardhan was sworn in as a cabinet minister in Prime Minister Narendra Modi's second term government. He is put in charge of the Minister of Health and Family Welfare, Minister of Science and Technology and Minister of Earth Sciences.

Vardhan has been prominent in this role during the COVID-19 pandemic in India. In February 2021, he endorsed an unproven "herbal cure" for COVID-19 devised by a company run by yoga guru Ramdev, prompting criticism from health experts. In early March 2021, he declared the country was in the "endgame" of the pandemic, shortly before infections across the country rose dramatically in its second wave in April.

Vardhan as a cabinet minister in Narendra Modi government, declared reservation for academic calendar 2020-2021 in MBBS and BDS colleges for the children of COVID-19 workers who died during COVID-19 pandemic in India.

As a part of Cabinet Reshuffle on 7 July 2021, Dr Harshvardhan resigned from his post of Union Health Minister after holding its two years of office.

Controversies
At the 105th Indian Science Congress in March 2018, after the death of legendary British scientist Stephen Hawking, Vardhan claimed that Hawking had said that the Vedas postulated a theory superior to Albert Einstein's theory of relativity, despite the fact that there is no record of Hawking having made the statement.

In 2019, after the Health Effects Institute released a scientific report estimating 1.2 million annual deaths in India due to air pollution, Vardhan denied the results, arguing that this report was intended to create panic In 2021, Indian Medical Association (IMA), the largest association of doctors in India, issued a statement which it objected to Vardhan who was  endorsing Coronil, a product of Patanjali Ayurved. IMA questioned the ethics of a health minister of the country to release a fabricated and unscientific product to the people of the country.

Awards and honours
Vardhan has received the following awards and recognitions:

 IMA President's Special Award of Appreciation by the Indian Medical Association in 1994.
 Director-General's Polio Eradication Champion Award Commendation Medal by the World Health Organization in 1998.
 Polio Eradication Champion Award by the Rotary International in 2001.
 "Doctor of the last Decade" (Swasthya Ratna) by Indian Medical Association's New Delhi branch in 2002.
 Director-General's Special World No Tobacco Day Award, by WHO in 2021, for bringing legislation to ban e-cigarettes and  Heated tobacco products, on the occasion of World No Tobacco Day.

Personal life
Vardhan is married to Nutan, and they have two sons and one daughter.

Bibliography

See also
 Pulse Polio programme in India
 Fifth Legislative Assembly of Delhi

References

|-

|-

|-

|-

|-

External links

 

1954 births
Living people
Indian surgeons
Bharatiya Janata Party politicians from Delhi
State cabinet ministers of Delhi
Health ministers of India
Members of the Delhi Legislative Assembly
India MPs 2014–2019
Lok Sabha members from Delhi
Members of the Cabinet of India
Leaders of the Opposition in the Delhi Legislative Assembly
Delhi MLAs 2013–2015
Delhi MLAs 2008–2013
Narendra Modi ministry
Medical doctors from Delhi
India MPs 2019–present
National Democratic Alliance candidates in the 2019 Indian general election